North Carolina Highway 90 (NC 90) is a primary state highway in the U.S. state of North Carolina.  It is one of the few highways in the state with an unpaved portion.

Route description
The western terminus is in Edgemont (in Caldwell County) at an intersection with Edgemont Road (SR 1420), Roseboro Road (Pisgah National Forest FR 981) and Edgemont Church Place (SR 1358). The first  of the highway are quite curvy and unpaved. NC 90 enters Lenoir on Valway Road (SR 1352). The route then turns left onto N. Main Street to then overlap with US 321 on Blowing Rock Boulevard. NC 90 then turn left, after 2 miles, onto Wilkesboro Boulevard to overlap with US 64 and NC 18. After about 2 miles, the route then turns right onto Taylorsville Road, keeping and overlap with US 64. After 40 miles, going through Taylorsville, NC 90 ends at US 21/US 64 in Statesville.

History
Established in 1921 as an original state highway, it started at NC 50 (Person Street), in Raleigh, going east to Columbia.  In 1927, NC 90 was extended west from Raleigh to Lenoir at NC 18.  In 1929, NC 90 extended east from Columbia to Fort Landing.

In 1932, US 64 was established and was overlapped on NC 90 from just west of Statesville to Fort Landing.  In late 1934, NC 90 was removed from all overlap with US 64 east of Statesville; at same time, NC 90 was extended west from Lenoir to US 221 near Linville, replacing NC 171.

Sometime between 1939–44, NC 90 was extended east back in Statesville to its current east terminus, replacing some of US 64 through the downtown area.  At some point in the 1960s, NC 90 was truncated to its current west terminus in Edgemont, its former route to Linville moved under Pisgah National Forest management.

In 2008, NC 90 was removed from downtown Lenoir, creating an overlap with US 321.

Major intersections

Special routes

Rocky Mount alternate route

North Carolina Highway 90 Alternate (NC 90A) was new alternate routing through downtown Rocky Mount, via Thomas Avenue.  In 1934, it was replaced by US 64A.

See also
 North Carolina Bicycle Route 2 - Concurrent with NC 90 from US 64 / NC 18 in Lenoir to Main Avenue Drive in Taylorsville

References

External links

 
 NCRoads.com: N.C. 90
 NCRoads.com: N.C. 90-A

090
Transportation in Caldwell County, North Carolina
Transportation in Alexander County, North Carolina
Transportation in Iredell County, North Carolina